Stony Range Botanic Garden is a botanic garden specialising in native Australian flora located in Dee Why, New South Wales, Australia. The garden is wheelchair accessible, has walking tracks of varying lengths and inclinations, and can be booked for functions and weddings.

The garden is jointly administered by Northern Beaches Council and a voluntary advisory committee. The garden also receives support in the form of public donations, and volunteers who care for the garden.

The garden also hosts an annual Spring Festival.

History 
Officially opened in 1961 as the Stony Range Flora Reserve, the Stony Range Botanic Garden is so named due to its location on the site of an old stone quarry.

The site was revegetated and regenerated by local volunteers using local indigenous species as well as native plants from across Australia. Today, there are several microclimates within the garden: the rainforest gully, the sandstone heath, and the Federation Cascades.

References 

Botanical gardens in New South Wales
New South Wales articles missing geocoordinate data
Northern Beaches Council